Brackenbottom is a village in Ribblesdale, North Yorkshire, England.

External links

Villages in North Yorkshire
Ribblesdale